Edgar H. Kienholz (May 18, 1889 – October 1, 1974) was an American football, basketball, and baseball coach. He served as the head football coach at Santa Clara University from 1923 to 1924 and Occidental College from 1928 to 1931, compiling a career college football coaching record of 26–22–3. He was also Santa Clara's head basketball coach from 1923 to 1925 and head baseball coach in 1924. Kienholz was the head football coach at Long Beach Polytechnic High School from 1916 to 1922. In 1935, he was hired as the head basketball coach at the California Institute of Technology (Caltech).

Kienholz died on October 1, 1974, at this home in Laguna Hills, California.

Head coaching record

College football

References

External links
 

1889 births
1974 deaths
American football halfbacks
Basketball coaches from Minnesota
Caltech Beavers men's basketball coaches
Occidental Tigers football coaches
Occidental Tigers men's basketball coaches
Santa Clara Broncos athletic directors
Santa Clara Broncos baseball coaches
Santa Clara Broncos football coaches
Santa Clara Broncos men's basketball coaches
Washington State Cougars football players
High school football coaches in California
People from Lac qui Parle County, Minnesota
Players of American football from Minnesota
Coaches of American football from Minnesota